The Vojvodina Rugby Club, (Serbian:  Рагби клуб Војводинаm) is a rugby union team from Novi Sad, Serbia. The club is a member of the Rugby Union of Serbia. The team wears a red and white strip.

History 
In September 2001, a group of enthusiasts and lovers of rugby founded Ragbi Klub Vojvodina.

Current squad 

Senior Squad:

External links 
 vojvodinaragbiklub.rs official site (in Serbian)

References

Serbian rugby union teams
Rugby clubs established in 2001